Sansoen Suea Pa (Thai: สรรเสริญเสือป่า, lit: Glorify to Wild Tigers) is the march of the Wild Tiger Corps. It is a western arrangement of Bulan Loi Luean, a song composed by King Rama II (continued by ) that was used as the royal anthem during King Rama V's reign.

The song was originally used as a salute to the Wild Tiger Corps. It is still performed in various ceremonies related to the Thai king.

Lyrics

Notes

References

External links 

A recording of the song being performed by the Chulalongkorn University

Thai military marches